One Roof Women is a Melbourne start-up for women's entrepreneurship.

History 
One Roof Women was founded by former corporate lawyer Sheree Rubinstein, and US-based strategist Gianna Wurzl. In 2015, after establishing coworking spaces in Melbourne and Los Angeles, Rubinstein and Wurzl incorporated a Sydney women's coworking space, founded by Catriona Wallace.

The One Roof model first looked at converting under-utilised physical spaces to transform them into shared workspaces for women. One Roof sought to create an ecosystem for businesswomen. This incorporated traditional networking and publicity infrastructure, such as business and start-up events and workshops, into less traditional support structures, such as yoga and meditation classes. They were supported by networked service agreements for new businesses, such as legal, finance, fundraising, and communications services.

In April 2016, One Roof took over space in Southbank, containing co-working and office spaces. One Roof estimates it has engaged 10,000 women across four cities and hosted over 500 workshops. Rubinstein won the 2016 Victorian Young Achievers Leadership Award, and was nominated as one of Australia's top young innovators by The Foundation for Young Australians for One Roof's contribution to women in business. In 2015, Rubinstein won a $10,000 seed grant from BASF. Rubinstein continued her connection with the One Roof charity partner SHE, run by Melbourne-based non-profit YGAP, which creates female entrepreneurs with its accelerator programs in Kenya, South Africa, and Australia.

References

Companies based in Melbourne
Service companies of Australia